{{Album ratings
| rev1 = Allmusic
| rev1Score = <ref name=""allmusic"">{{cite web|url=https://www.allmusic.com/album/celtic-solstice-mw0000602341|title=Celtic Solstice|work=Allmusic|accessdate=2022-04-24}}</ref>}}Celtic Solstice'' is an album by Paul Winter, released in 1999 through the record label Living Music. In 2000, the album earned him a Grammy Award for Best New Age Album.

Track listing
 "Triumph" (Halley, Spillane, Winter) – 7:06
 "Golden Apples of the Sun" (W. B. Yeats, Travis Edmonson) – 6:25
 "Hollow Hills" (Spillane) – 1:55
 "O'Farrell's Welcome to Limerick" (traditional) – 4:36
 "Dawnwalker" (Halley, Spillane) – 6:43
 "My Fair and Faithful Love/Blarney Pilgram" (Maclean, traditional) – 5:23
 "Sweet Comeraghs" (Faoli·in) – 3:55
 "After the Fleadh/Running Through the Woods With Keetu" (Fahy, Madden) – 6:45
 "The Minister's Adieu" (Thomas) – 2:09
 "Farewell to Govan" (Cunningham) – 2:58
 "Golden Apples of the Sun (Reprise)" – 7:06
 "Dawnwalker (Reprise)" (Halley, Spillane) – 2:32

Personnel
 Paul Winter – soprano saxophone
 Joanie Madden – flute and whistle
 Davy Spillane – uilleann pipes
 Jerry O'Sullivan – uilleann pipes
 Paul Halley – pipe organ and piano
 Eileen Ivers – fiddle
 Carol Thompson – Celtic harp and Welsh triple harp
 Zan McLoed – guitar
 Bakithi Kumalo – bass
 Austin McGrath – bodhrán
 Jamey Haddad – percussion
 Karan Casey – vocals

See also
 Celtic music in the United States
 Folk music of Ireland

References

1999 albums
Grammy Award for Best New Age Album
Paul Winter albums